Knema alvarezii is a species of plant in the family Myristicaceae. It is endemic to the Philippines.

References

Flora of the Philippines
alvarezii
Vulnerable plants
Taxonomy articles created by Polbot
Taxa named by Elmer Drew Merrill